The Mississauga Tomahawks are a Junior "B" box lacrosse team from Mississauga, Ontario, Canada.  The Mississauga Tomahawks play in the OLA Junior B Lacrosse League.

History 
Brampton Excelsiors 1989 - 1994
Brampton-Milton Mavericks 1995
Milton Mavericks 1996 to 2006
Mississauga Tomahawks 2007 to Present

The franchise has a bit of a split history with regards to where it is at this point in time.  The current owners brought the team to Mississauga by way of Milton.  It started out as a feeder team for the OLA Junior A Lacrosse League's  Brampton Excelsiors.  In 1995, the team went separate ways from its parent club and moved to Milton.  Under the Junior "A" club, the franchise never really did that well.  The release from the Junior "A" Excelsiors seemed to be a good thing.  After two slow seasons, business seemed to pick up from 1997 until 1999. In 1999 The Milton Mavericks led by notable players such as Jim Leworthy, Andrew Hartholt, and arguably the best Jr’B goalie at the time Andrew Dowdell, made a valiant run at the Founders Cup Championship. The Mavericks, entered the Founders cup Tournament as underdogs, but quickly showed the rest of the field that they were there to win. The Squad eventually fell short losing the gold medal game to the Edmonton Minors, 13–10. Many players from both squads went onto to play in both the MSL and the NLL

The team went on hiatus in 2000 after a 15-6-0 run in the 1999 season.  The team did not return until 2002, but they were not the same.  After three mediocre losing seasons, the team went on hiatus again in 2005.  The team returned in 2006 under new the management of Craig Ferchat and Jim Meagher but with little or no support from either the Milton Minor Lacrosse Association or the Village of Milton. Local sponsorship was near zero and the player pool was small and shrinking, approximately 250 players in the last year.

In the Fall of 2006 the team was successfully moved to Mississauga, Ontario and changed its name to the Mississauga Tomahawks Jr. B Lacrosse Club. In Mississauga it now enjoys a large and growing player pool of approximately 750-900 players/year, excellent cooperation with the Mississauga Tomahawks Lacrosse Association and the Mississauga Tomahawks Jr. A team. The warm reception from the City of Mississauga and local sponsors is a welcome change for the team.

The name change creates yet another chapter in Mississauga junior lacrosse history, for more info, please see: Mississauga Tomahawks.

Season-by-season results

Note: GP = Games played, W = Wins, L = Losses, T = Ties, Pts = Points, GF = Goals for, GA = Goals against

Notable alumni
John Tavares
Andrew Dowdell
Chris Powless
Jim Leworthy Jr 
Corey Leigh

External links
Mississauga Tomahawks Jr. A Lacrosse Website
Mississauga Tomahawks Jr. B Lacrosse Website
Jr. A Lacrosse League Website
Ontario Lacrosse Association (OLA)

Ontario Lacrosse Association teams
Sport in Mississauga